Belwa Parsauni is a village development committee in Parsa District in the Narayani Zone of southern Nepal. At the time of the 2011 Nepal census it had a population of 9,310 people living in 1,370 individual households. There were 4,790 males and 4,511 females at the time of census.

References

Populated places in Parsa District